This is primarily a list of notable people who contributed to the history of Eastern Orthodox Christianity's theology or culture. However it is also for people whose Eastern Orthodox identity is an important part of their notability. As there are many nations that are predominantly Eastern Orthodox names from such nations should usually meet a stricter standard, but in the case of converts their conversion might be notable enough to make an exception.

Artists

Andrei Rublev – important in the history of Russian Iconography
El Greco – from Crete, noted for Christian art
Feofan Grek – noted iconographer
Boris Kustodiev – Russian artist known for depictions of Russian Orthodox people and culture
Jerzy Nowosielski – famous Polish painter, noted for his numerous works of Byzantine-influenced religious art
Karl Matzek – convert from Catholicism who did religious art for the faith
Prokhor of Gorodets – icon painter
Toros Roslin – Armenian of Oriental Orthodoxy, but some of his works are Byzantine-influenced
Simon Ushakov – leading religious artist linked to the reforms of Patriarch Nikon
Valentin Alexandrovich Serov – Russian painter, and one of the premier portrait artists of his era.
Constantin Brâncuși – Romanian world-renowned sculptor
Gala Dalí – (Birth name Elena Ivanovna Diakonova Russian: Елена Ивановна Дьяконов), model, wife and muse of Salvador Dalí.
Aminé – Ethiopian-American rapper.

Entrepreneurs/industrialists
 Nikolay Alekseyev
 Igor Sikorsky

Entertainers
Jennifer Aniston
Stana Katic
John Belushi – member of the Albanian Orthodox Church in childhood; his funeral was in that faith 
James Belushi – member of the Albanian Orthodox Church, John's brother.
Charles Bronson – former Russian Orthodox, son of a Kryashen.
Yul Brynner – actor. His remains were interred in France on the grounds of the Saint-Michel-de-Bois-Aubry Russian Orthodox monastery near Luzé between Tours and Poitiers.
George Chakiris – contributor to a Greek Orthodox Cathedral
Michael Chiklis – actor, second generation Greek-American..
Anna Maria – Indonesian model
Kira Kazantsev – Miss America 2015
Vassiliki Betty Cantrell – Greek Orthodox Church Sunday school teacher, Miss America 2016
Sandra Dee – (birth name: Alexandra Cymboliak Zuck). One time wife of Bobby Darin. Raised Russian Orthodox in New Jersey. Her mother was of Carpathian Russian ancestry.
Nina Dobrev
Olympia Dukakis – actress, Greek Orthodox.
Tina Fey – Greek-American on her mother's side and married in a Greek Orthodox wedding.
Zach Galifianakis – Baptized at St. Barbara's Greek Orthodox Church in Durham, NC
Tom Hanks – Converted on marrying Rita Wilson, mention by Saint Sophia Cathedral, Los Angeles.
Hank Hanegraaff – radio talk host and important figure of Christian countercult movement, Chrismated at St. Nektarios Greek Orthodox Church in Charlotte, NC.
Jonathan Jackson – actor, convert from Protestant Church
Andreas Katsulas – actor; Greek Orthodox.  Before his passing, he requested that memorials be made to St. Nicholas Greek Orthodox Church, St. Louis, MO.
Melina Kanakaredes – St. Nicholas's Greek Orthodox Church listed her as a possible speaker, credits the church as helpful to her in youth.  Grew up at Annunciation Greek Orthodox Church in Akron, OH 
Elia Kazan – Director, born to Greek parents who immigrated from the Ottoman Empire to the United States 
Emir Kusturica – Serbian Orthodox. Raised in a Bosnian Muslim Family. His conversion gained some media attention.
Ana Layevska – Ukrainian-born Mexican actress and violinist (of Russian origin)
Karl Malden (Mladen Sekulovich) – said to have been Serbian Orthodox.
Constantine Maroulis – Greek Orthodox, brother of Athan Maroulis
Debbie Matenopoulos
Maria Menounos – actress, presenter
Telly Savalas – contributed to Greek Orthodox Cathedrals and his bald image began after playing Pontius Pilate
Amy Sedaris – American actress, author and comedian
Shawnee Smith – American actress, Smith is a convert to the Russian Orthodox Church
John Stamos – American actor
Nia Vardalos – actress 
Rita Wilson – actress 
Lana Wood (birth name: Svetlana Gurdin, family name changed from Zakharenko) Russian Orthodox actress – sister of Natalie Wood.
Natalia Nikolaevna Zakharenko – Russian Orthodox actress known as Natalie Wood.
Mahesa Gibran – Indonesian actor
Cary-Hiroyuki Tagawa – On November 12, 2015, he was baptized as Panteleymon in the Russian Orthodox Joy of All Who Sorrow church in Moscow
Alla Pugacheva – Russian singer and model

Musicians and composers
Djuro Zivkovic - a contemporary Serbian-Swedish composer, born 1975 in Belgrade, since 2000 based in Sweden.
Maksym Berezovsky - Known for religious music 
Dmytro Bortniansky - Religious music.
John Craton - American classical composer
George Enescu - Romanian composer
Bill Evans
Enca (Ruensa Haxhiaj) - Albanian pop singer
Alexander Frey - Conductor, pianist, organist and composer, was baptized in the Greek Orthodox church, but is also a practicing Episcopalian.
David Gahan - English lead singer for Depeche Mode, converted to Greek Orthodox Christianity to marry his current wife Jennifer.
Chris Hillman - original member of The Byrds
Lena Katina - Member of Russian music group t.A.T.u.
Boris Ledkovsky - Russian-American composer of Church music
George Michael - celebrity pop singer, a Greek-Cypriote.
Dimitris Mitropoulos - Conductor, pianist and composer. Music Director of the New York Philharmonic and the Minneapolis Symphony Orchestra.
Stevan Stojanović Mokranjac - one of the most famous Serbian composers and music educators of the nineteenth century.
Ivan Moody - British composer, conductor and Orthodox priest.
Katie Melua - singer
Inva Mula - Albanian Orthodox, famous opera singer.
Arvo Pärt – Estonian composer, known for religious music, convert from Lutheranism 
Georgs Pelēcis – Latvian composer and musicologist.
Ciprian Porumbescu - Romanian composer
Tose Proeski - Macedonian pop singer
Nikolai Rimsky-Korsakov - Possibly atheist after some point, but did Russian Orthodox church music.
Sergei Rachmaninoff<ref>{{cite web |url=http://yonkerstribune.com/modules.php?name=News&file=article&sid=4935 |title=Yonkers Tribune - Celebrating Rachmaninovs Life and Death |website=yonkerstribune.com |access-date=20 July 2022 |archive-url=https://web.archive.org/web/20030831080257/http://yonkerstribune.com/modules.php?name=News&file=article&sid=4935 |archive-date=31 August 2003 |url-status=dead}}</ref>
Mstislav Rostropovich - Conductor, National Symphony, cellist
Kurt Sander - American composer who converted to Russian Orthodoxy in 1993.  Composer of the first complete English-language setting of the Liturgy of St. John Chrysostom.
Thomas Simaku - Albanian Orthodox, famous composer
Trey Spruance - Leader of the multi-genre outfit Secret Chiefs 3
Igor Stravinsky - Left the faith from 1900 to 1926, after rejoining he did Symphony of Psalms.
John Tavener - Converted to Orthodoxy, and much of his music is influenced by that. He is now often said to be Universalist or Perrenialist, although he himself says that he remains Orthodox.
Pyotr Ilyich Tchaikovsky - Russian composer of the Romantic era. His wide-ranging output includes symphonies, operas, ballets, instrumental and chamber music and songs
Stephen M. Wolownik - Church music early on

Historians
Fr. Demetrios Constantelos - professor of history and religious studies, Richard Stockton College, Pomona, New Jersey
George Pachymeres - Byzantine chief advocate of the church
Avraamy Palitsyn - Russian historian who died at the Solovetsky Monastery
Jaroslav Pelikan - professor of ecclesiastical history, Yale University, and a convert from Lutheranism
Nicephorus Callistus Xanthopoulos - Byzantine ecclesiastical historian
John Xiphilinus - also a monk
Joannes Zonaras - also a theologian
Nikolay Yakovlevich Danilevsky
Mircea Eliade - famous Romanian writer, philosopher and historian
Evagrius Scholasticus - 6th century Byzantine historian.
Sozomen - wrote a history that ended in the year 429 A.D.
Socrates Scholasticus - wrote a church history that ended in the year 439 A.D, during Theodosius II (or Younger's) reign.
Saint Theophanes the Confessor - Byzantine Saint, who championed the cause of the Iconodules, who venerate icons. He wrote a 9th-century Byzantine Chronicle.

Journalists
Saša Petricic - award-winning Serbian Canadian journalist. Since 2011, he has been Middle East correspondent and videojournalist for CBC Television's The National and other CBC News programs.
Ernie Anastos - New York television anchor
Thalia Assuras - CBS News anchor
Alexis Christoforous - CBS News anchor / correspondent
Chris Clark - retired news anchor, WTVF, Nashville, Tennessee
Rod Dreher - Dallas Morning News columnist, "Crunchy Con" blog
Mike Emanuel - Fox News  White House Correspondent
Terry Mattingly - syndicated columnist
Natalie Jacobson - born Natalie Salatich, television news anchor, WCVB - Boston - Serbian Orthodox
Serge Schmemann - International Herald Tribune writer/editor
George Stephanopoulos - ABC News chief Washington correspondent; a former altar boy, and son of a priest.

Linguists
Nikita Yakovlevich Bichurin - Russian Orthodox Church monk and Sinologist
Saint Innocent of Alaska - wrote books on Tlingit and worked on an alphabet for Aleut
Pyotr Kafarov - student of Bichurin, also a Sinologist and ROC monk
Mateja Matejić - priest in the Serbian Orthodox Church
Alexander Nedoshivin - Russian Orthodox Church priest and Esperantist
Epifany Slavinetsky - Polyglot, Russian Orthodox Church monk, and translator
Roman Jakobson - Structuralist linguist and literary theorist; converted to Orthodoxy in 1975.

Modern politicians
Note: Most political figures in the Byzantine Empire, or most other Medieval Eastern European Empires, would be at least nominally Eastern Orthodox. Therefore, this is limited to modern times, specifically after 1800. For United States entries Political Graveyard was used for this section, but additional sources are encouraged.

The list is not complete; the vast majority of politicians in countries such as Greece, Romania, Cyprus, Russia, Serbia and others are Eastern Orthodox.

United States / Canada
Spencer Abraham - former Senator (R-MI) and Energy Secretary
Justin Amash - former member of Congress (L-MI) (Antiochian Orthodox)
Eleni Bakopanos - former Canadian Member of Parliament (Lib-PQ)
Melissa Bean - former member of Congress (D-IL)
Helen Delich Bentley - former US Congresswoman (R-MD) (Serbian Orthodox) 
Michael Bilirakis - former member of Congress (R-FL) (Greek Orthodox) 
Gus Bilirakis - member of Congress (R-FL) (Greek Orthodox)
Rod Blagojevich - former Illinois Governor (D) (Serbian Orthodox)
Tony Clement - former Ontario Minister of Health and federal MP (Cons-ON) (Greek Cypriot)
Michael Dukakis - former Governor and Presidential candidate (D-MA) 
Nick Galifianakis - former Congressman (D-NC)
George Gekas - former Congressman (R-PA)
Ray Hnatyshyn - Governor-General of Canada (1990–1995)
Michael Huffington - former Congressman and Senatorial candidate (R-CA)
Johnny Joannou - member of Virginia House of Delegates (D-79)
Nicole Malliotakis - member of Congress (R-NY), frm. New York State assemblywoman (Greek Orthodox)
Eleni Kounalakis - lt. Governor of California (D-CA) (Greek Orthodox)
Nicholas Mavroules - former Congressman (D-MA) 
John Sarbanes - member of Congress (D-MD) (Greek Orthodox)
Paul Sarbanes - former U.S. Senator (D-MD) (Greek Orthodox)
Chris Pappas - member of Congress (D-NH) (Greek Orthodox)
Mary Peltola - member of Congress (D-AK) (Russian Orthodox)
Andrew S. Shandro - Alberta MLA (Lib)
Dean Skelos - New York State Senate Majority Leader (R)
Olympia Snowe - U.S. Senator (R-ME); Attended St. Basil's Academy 
George Tenet - former CIA Director 
Paul Tsongas - late U.S. Senator and Presidential candidate (D-MA) 
John N. Wozniak - member of Pennsylvania Senate (D-35)

Europe / Middle East

Michel Aflaq - founder of Baathism
Miron Cristea - first patriarch of the Romanian Orthodox Church and Prime Minister for about a year
Constantine Karamanlis - first Prime Minister of the Third Hellenic Republic, Former President of Greece (ND)
Boris Tadić - former President of Serbia
Tomislav Nikolić - former President of Serbia
Aleksandar Vučić - President of Serbia
Kostas Karamanlis - Prime Minister of Greece (ND)
Vojislav Koštunica - former Prime Minister of Serbia.
Leonid Kuchma - former President of Ukraine.
Makarios III - President of Cyprus
Dmitry Medvedev - former President of Russia
Fan S. Noli - Albanian-Orthodox bishop and briefly prime-minister of Albania
Tassos Papadopoulos - President of Cyprus
Andreas Papandreou - former Prime Minister of Greece (PASOK)
Vladimir Putin - President of Russia & Former Prime Minister of Russia
Fyodor Rtishchev
Mikhail Saakashvili - Former President of Georgia
Eduard Shevardnadze - former President of Georgia
Volodymyr Zelenskyy - current President of Ukraine
Eleftherios Venizelos - former Prime Minister of Greece
Viktor Yushchenko - former President of Ukraine
Constantin Zureiq - early Arab nationalist leader
Vlad Tepes - 15th-century Wallachian prince of the house of Dracul. He reluctantly converted to Roman Catholicism after months of torture by King Matthias Corvinus of Hungary and Croatia.
Tedros Adhanom Ghebreyesus - Director-General of the World Health Organization (WHO).He has held the latter office since 2017.He served in the Government of Ethiopia as Minister of Health from 2005 to 2012 and as Minister of Foreign Affairs from 2012 to 2016

Scientists
Anthemius of Tralles - architect who designed the Hagia Sophia in Constantinople
Abram Samoilovitch Besicovitch - mathematician
Nikolay Bogolyubov (1909–1992) - theoretical physicist and mathematician
Theodosius Dobzhansky - evolutionary biologist
Pavel Florensky - worked on Dielectrics and theodicy
Alexander Friedmann - discovered the expanding universe solution to the Einstein field equations
John Kanzius - raised Russian Orthodox, created an experimental cancer treatment using radio waves and discovered how to use radio frequencies to ignite salt water.
Sergei Korolev - designed the R-7 rocket which launched the Space Age on October 4, 1957
Dmitri Mendeleev - chemist and inventor, formulated the Periodic Law
Josif Pančić - noted botanist, physician, and Orthodox convert
Ivan Pavlov - his father was a Russian Orthodox priest, and Ivan Pavlov was enrolled in the seminary before reading The Origin of Species 
John Philoponus - "Christian philosopher, scientist, and theologian" 
Alexander Popov - radio pioneer, son of a priest, planned to study in the seminary
Michael I. Pupin - famous physicist
Nikola Tesla - inventor, electrical engineer, mechanical engineer, and futurist
Nicolae Paulescu - Romanian physiologist, professor of medicine, and politician, the discoverer of pancreine
Victor Babeș - Romanian physician, biologist, and one of the earliest bacteriologists
Ana Aslan - Romanian biologist and physician who discovered the anti-aging effects of procaine
Petrache Poenaru - Romanian inventor of the fountain pen
Henri Coanda - Romanian inventor, aerodynamics pioneer and builder of an experimental aircraft
Aurel Vlaicu - Romanian engineer, inventor, airplane constructor and early pilot

Writers/philosophers
Ivo Andrić - Serbian writer, Nobel prize winner
Nikolai Berdyaev - Russian Orthodox Christian existentialist philosopher
Metropolitan Anthony (Bloom) of Sourozh - Russian bishop and writer
Bruce Chatwin - English novelist and travel writer
Michael Choniates - Byzantine Greek writer and ecclesiastic
Fyodor Dostoevsky - many of his novels, like The Idiot and The Brothers Karamazov, have specific Russian Orthodox themes
Jim Forest - American writer, peace activist and lay theologian
Alexander Galich - Russian Jewish convert who wrote poems and screenplays. (Also joined the National Alliance of Russian Solidarists)
Nikolai Vasilievich Gogol - considered the father of modern Russian realism, but at the same time, his work is very much in the genre of romanticism.
David Bentley Hart - American academic philosophical theologian and author
Ivan Ilyin - Slavophile, wrote Axioms of Religious ExperienceEugen Ionescu - Romanian writer
Paul Kingsnorth - English writer who lives in the west of Ireland
Ivan Kireevsky - often considered the father of Russian and Slavophile philosophy
Thom Nickels - American author, journalist wrote Philadelphia Architecture and Literary Philadelphia: A History of Prose & Poetry in the City of Brotherly Love''.
Konstantin Pobedonostsev - Russian jurist, statesman, and adviser to three Tsars
Alexander Sergeyevich Pushkin - Russian author of the Romantic era who is considered by many to be the greatest Russian poet and the founder of modern Russian literature.
Seraphim Rose - American convert and monastic writer
Frank Schaeffer - American author and liberal commentator, son of Evangelical apologist and "father of the Christian right" Francis Schaeffer. Frank Schaeffer rejected Reformed Protestant fundamentalism and converted to Orthodoxy in 1992, which he continues to self-identify as.
Aleksandr Solzhenitsyn - Russian Orthodox author
Richard Swinburne - British analytic philosopher and convert to Orthodoxy late in life from Anglicanism
Eugene Vodolazkin - Russian author
Timothy Ware - English metropolitan bishop and theologian
Christos Yannaras - Greek philosopher and theologian

Theologians and clergy
Mother Thekla - Marina Scharfe - Kislovodsk 1918 - XXXX
Gregory the Wonderworker - early bishop of Neocaesarea
Michael Apostolius
Basil of Caesarea - one of the Three Holy Hierarchs and a Doctor of the Church in Catholicism
Gregory of Nyssa - 4th century bishop and brother of the Saint Basil the Great
Cyril of Alexandria - 5th century Patriarch of Alexandria and the most important defender of Virgin Mary's title as the *Theotokos
Epiphanius of Salamis - 5th century Saint and Bishop. He wrote the Panarion and other theological works.
Georges Florovsky
Saint Maximus the Confessor - saint and monk who lived from 580 to 662 A.D. He defend Dyothelitism and Dyoenergism against Monoenergism, and Monothelitism later.
Charles Sydney Gibbes - English tutor of the Romanov children.
Michael Glycas - also a historian and poet
Spyridon, Bishop of Cyprus - bishop and saint who attended the First Council of Nicea in 325 A.D.
Saint Athanasius - Patriarch of Alexandria who lived from 296 to 373 A.D. He was once a deacon of *Saint Alexander of Alexandria, who was the former Patriarch of the Patriarchate. Athanasius defended the Homousion Faith and the Council of Nicea against Arianism.
Thomas Hopko
Archbishop Iakovos - former Leader of the Greek Orthodox Archdiocese of America
John of Kronstadt - Archpriest
Jeremias II - Patriarch of Constantinople
John of Damascus - 7th-8th century saint and monk. He eventually moved to Mar Saba Monastery in Jerusalem. He wrote "On the Divine Images," to defend the practice of icon veneration against the Byzantine Emperor.
Saint Theodore the Studite - 8th-9th century Saint and Monk. He wrote On the Holy Icons during the Second Period of Iconoclasm in the Byzantine Empire
John Chrysostom - one of the Three Holy Hierarchs and a Doctor of the Church in Catholicism
John of Climacus - Great Hegumen and ascetic who lived on Mount Sinai, in the 6th and 7th centuries, in Saint Catherine's Monastery. He wrote the Ladder of Divine Ascent.
John of Shanghai and San Francisco
John of Tobolsk
Konstantin of Murom
Father Emmanuel Lemelson - Greek Orthodox priest, hedge fund manager and social activist
Cyril Lucaris - Crypto-Protestant Patriarch of Constantinople
John Anthony McGuckin - priest and professor, originally a Latin rite Catholic, but he changed to the Romanian Orthodox tradition.
Alexander Men
John Meyendorff
Metropolitan Gerasimos - Metropolitan Bishop of San Francisco
Peter Mohyla
Gregory of Nazianzus - one of the Three Holy Hierarchs and a Doctor of the Church in Catholicism
Nicholas of Japan
Gregory Palamas
Grigol Peradze - Patristics, also a historian
Maximus Planudes
Justin Popović
Nikolaj Velimirović
Sergius of Radonezh
Alexander Schmemann
Gennadius Scholarius
Victor Sokolov - archpriest and Soviet dissident journalist
Theophan the Recluse
Patriarch Tikhon of Moscow - confessor
Joseph Volotsky - theologian/saint
Olaf II of Norway - Martyr-King of Norway, brought Christianity to Scandinavia
Saint Yared - legendary Ethiopian musician credited with inventing the sacred music tradition of the Ethiopian Orthodox Church and Ethiopia's system of musical notation.

Fools for Christ

Basil Fool for Christ
Nicholas Salos of Pskov
Xenia of Saint Petersburg

See also

List of Byzantine Empire-related topics
List of children of Orthodox priests
List of Orthodox dioceses and archdioceses
List of current patriarchs

References

Sources
On the politics section the main source is Political Graveyard: Eastern Orthodox Politicians.

For other sections Adherents.com Famous Adherents Eastern Orthodox Christians and NNDB.com were used. As these are unreliable additional searches on each individual were used for verification.

 
Eastern